Bodiam railway station is a heritage railway station on the Kent and East Sussex Railway in Bodiam, East Sussex.

History 
Situated half a mile from Bodiam village itself and its fourteenth century castle, the station opened in 1900 in a rather remote and rural location. It was surrounded by hop Gardens, mainly owned by Guinness, and helped to serve the industry in the area, bringing hop-pickers to and from the fields and transporting hops to the breweries. In 1910, a siding was added which effectively acted as a loop allowing freight trains to pass passenger trains. The station was known as "Bodiam for Staplecross".

In keeping with other stations on the line, the main station building was fitted out in typical spartan style. Only Gents toilet facilities were available and the urinal was flushed using water gathered in the building's rainwater pipe.

Dwindling passenger numbers and increased competition from road hauliers saw the line close to regular passenger services in 1954 but freight and occasional special passenger trains used the line until 1961. It was subsequently rescued in 1971 by the Tenterden Railway Company (now the Kent and East Sussex Railway) who purchased the line between Tenterden and Bodiam for £60,000. Its extension to Bodiam was completed in 2000 and the station now marks the line's southern terminus.

The Cavell Van, the railway van that conveyed Edith Cavell's remains from Dover to London is kept as a memorial and is usually open to view at Bodiam railway station.  The van also carried the bodies of Charles Fryatt and The Unknown Warrior.

Also The Train Now Standing was filmed there.

Services

References 

Heritage railway stations in East Sussex
Former Kent and East Sussex Railway stations
Railway stations in Great Britain opened in 1900
Railway stations in Great Britain closed in 1961
Railway stations in Great Britain opened in 2000
Rother District